Firth Concrete (legal title: Firth Industries) is New Zealand's largest and only national concrete company. It produces ready mix concrete under its Certified brand, a large range of concrete masonry (or grey masonry), paving, segmental retaining walls and veneers. It also has a range of bagged, pre-mixed product that is marketed under the Dricon brand.

History 
The business from which Firth evolved started at Matamata, New Zealand, in 1865. This original business was established by Josiah Firth, who arrived in New Zealand in 1856. On arriving Josiah decided that Auckland needed a modern flour mill. But first it needed a brick-making factory, so he built his own. Meanwhile, his son, Ned Firth, invented the ‘ironclad’ pumice washing boiler. This manufacturing business was later taken on by his sons, Ted and Tony Firth, and it was their joint venture that became Firth Concrete Limited.
 
In the beginning, concrete products in New Zealand were manufactured by hand in small-scale operations. But over the next fifty years driven by two successive building booms, the Firth brothers took their business from a two-man operation to a large, diverse business with branches throughout the country. In 1927 the company acquired its ‘Ironclad’ logo, designed by Clifton Firth. In 1938 it introduced New Zealand's first machine-made concrete blocks. The blocks were cast by a machine called a ‘Rockcrete’ at the company's Frankton factory in Hamilton.

Firth's modern history began in 1973 when Fletcher Holdings bought a minor holding in the company, completing a full buy-out in 1979.
In 1993, two Fletcher Challenge Limited business units – Certified Concrete Limited and Firth Concrete Products Limited – were merged to become the Firth company of today, a Business Unit of Fletcher Building Ltd. In April 2001 Fletcher Building separated from Fletcher Challenge to operate as a stand-alone company.

Today Firth has a team of about 650 people, working in more than 65 plant sites throughout New Zealand.

Products 

Firth products are divided into three product groups.

Certified concrete 
Firth has supplied concrete to large scale New Zealand projects such as: The Museum of New Zealand – Te Papa Tongarewa, The Auckland Sky Tower and Wellington's Westpac Trust Stadium. Latest project: The Victoria Park Tunnel in Auckland.

Masonry products 
Firth produces: masonry blocks, pavers, retaining wall products and bricks. It can make to order special mixes with specified colours, abrasion-resistance qualities, strengths and mix designs.

Dricon 
Dricon produces pre-mixed, bagged concretes, mortars, plasters and sands. Dricon has been in operation in New Zealand for over 40 years and the business is ISO 9001 Quality Certified. Dricon's products include: HandiCrete, RapidSet SuperSet and Oxitone, PaveLock, PaveSandTM

References 
 Fletcher Building divisions & businesses
 Firth company information
 Green build products
 Innovative concrete technology used in new bridge

External links 
 Firth Concrete

Manufacturing companies of New Zealand
Concrete
Manufacturing companies established in 1925
Matamata
New Zealand companies established in 1925